Khamir is a district of the 'Amran Governorate, Yemen. As of 2003, the district had a population of 73,225 inhabitants.

The center of the district is Khamir.

References

Districts of 'Amran Governorate
Khamir District